Charles Edward Axcell (14 March 1880 – 18 January 1949) was an English footballer who played in the Football League for Burton United and Stoke.

Career
Axcell was born in Leigh-on-Sea and played for Leigh Ramblers, Fulham and Grays United before joining Football League side Burton United in 1905. After a season and a half with Burton he joined Stoke in December 1906. However, he only played three matches for Stoke in 1906–07 failing to impress the directors who sent him back to Burton in February. He then returned Essex to play for Southend United.

Career statistics
Source:

References

English footballers
Burton United F.C. players
Fulham F.C. players
Stoke City F.C. players
Southend United F.C. players
English Football League players
1880 births
People from Leigh-on-Sea
1949 deaths
Association football forwards